Llanbrynmair is a village, community and electoral ward in Montgomeryshire, Powys, on the A470 road between Caersws and Machynlleth. Llanbrynmair, in area, is the second largest in Powys. In 2011, it had a population of 920.

Description
The community includes several hamlets: Talerddig, Dolfach, Bont-Dolgadfan, Pandy, Cringoed, Dylife and Pennant. The original centre is at Llan, on the road to Llanidloes, where the local parish church of St Mary is located. The current centre (formerly called "Wynnstay") at the junction of the A470 and B4518 rose to local prominence with the building of the new turnpike road in 1821 and the arrival of the railway line between Newtown and Machynlleth in 1861.

Geographically, the community includes the valleys of three rivers – Afon Twymyn, Afon Iaen and Afon Rhiw Saeson – and the surrounding uplands. The three rivers join around the main village and flow westwards as the Afon Twymyn towards the Afon Dyfi and Cardigan Bay.

The Cambrian railway line, built in the 1860s, runs through Llanbrynmair and for a time provided an outlet for the mines at Dylife, 8 miles south.  The village station closed in 1965 as part of the "Beeching closures". There was a level crossing next to the station but, following the accidental death of an American visitor in October 1999 and its description as a "blackspot", the crossing was closed and the road diverted.

The area is predominantly Welsh-speaking and reliant upon livestock farming. It was fortunate to escape the foot and mouth disease outbreak in Britain in 2001.

A bilingual book was published in 2005 reviewing the history of the parish of Llanbrynmair in the twentieth century compiled by the Llanbrynmair Local History Society..

History
Much of the area was part of the large Wynnstay Estate owned for generations by the families of Sir Watcyn Williams Wynne. The connection is noted in the "Wynnstay Arms", a prominent local public house.

The parish of Llanbrynmair played prominent roles in both the "Nonconformist Revolution" of the late 18th Century and the emigration to America during the 19th and early 20th centuries. This cultural revolution was the movement of Welsh religious independents to break from the established Church of England. The parish is reputed to have been the source of the most emigrants, per capita, to America of any in Wales. The first of them departed Llanbrynmair in 1796. A large proportion of these emigrants settled in western Ohio, particularly in the rural farming communities of Paddy's Run (now Shandon), Gomer and Venedocia. The two most prominent emigrants were Edward Bebb and Ezekiel Hughes, who settled in Butler County, Ohio near Paddy's Run. Edward Bebb's son, William, became governor of the State of Ohio. Josiah Jones, hymnologist under the pen name Josiah Brynmair, emigrated to and is buried in Gomer, Ohio.

Governance
Llanbrynmair has a community council representing the interests of the community. Ten councillors are on the council, with six representing the Wynnstay community ward and four from the Bontdolgadfan ward.

Llanbrynmair also forms a ward for Powys County Council and elects one county councillor

Notable people and former residents
 John Breese (1789-1842) Independent Minister. 
 Aled Wyn Davies (born 1974), a classical tenor singer.
 Richard Davies (Mynyddog) (1833–1877), poet.
 Julines Herring (1582–1644/5), a Puritan clergyman, a staunch proponent of Presbyterianism
 Richard P. Howell (1831-1899), American politician, carpenter, and businessman.
 Iorwerth Peate (1901–1982), founder, National Folk Museum of Wales, St. Fagan's
 Abraham Rees (1743–1825), compiler of Rees's Cyclopædia.
 Samuel Roberts (1800–1885), political & economic writer.
 Eirug Wyn (1950–2004), satirical novelist.

References

External links
 Llanbrynmair Community Council
 Llanbrynamir Community Site
 Teachers Llanbrynmair School 1898

Communities in Powys
Villages in Powys
Wards of Powys